Fucellia costalis is a species of root-maggot fly in the family Anthomyiidae.

References

Anthomyiidae
Articles created by Qbugbot
Insects described in 1910